Oldbury is a surname. Notable people with the surname include:

Derek Oldbury (1924–1994), British draughts champion
Ede Oldbury (1888–1977), New Zealand domestic servant, storekeeper, and community leader